Live in Concert is a live album by the noise pop band The Jesus and Mary Chain, released in 2003.  It contains recordings from two concerts from 1992 and 1995.

Track listing
All songs written by Jim Reid and William Reid, except where noted.
CD (SFRSCD117)
"Catch Fire" - 4:36
"Blues from a Gun" - 4:20
"Head On" - 4:02
"Reverence" - 4:55
"Far Gone and Out" - 2:48
"Half Way to Crazy" - 3:09
"Sidewalking" - 8:02
"Reverence" - 5:19
"Snakedriver" - 3:49
"Come On" (J. Reid) - 2:48
"Happy When It Rains" - 3:22
"Teenage Lust" - 3:39
"The Perfect Crime" (J. Reid) - 1:38
"Everybody I Know" (W. Reid) - 2:10
"Girlfriend" (W. Reid) - 3:13
"Hole" (J. Reid) - 2:05
"Head On" - 4:14
"Sugar Ray" - 4:38
"I Hate Rock 'n' Roll" (W. Reid) - 3:43

Notes 
 Tracks 1-7: Recorded 28 March 1992 at Sheffield Arena
 Tracks 8-19: Recorded 19 April 1995 at Trinity College, Bristol

References

External links

The Jesus and Mary Chain albums
2003 live albums
BBC Radio recordings